White Cargo is a 1930 British drama film directed by J.B. Williams and starring Leslie Faber, John F. Hamilton and Maurice Evans.  Originally made at Twickenham Studios as a silent film, it had sound sequences added at Whitehall Studios, Elstree.

Plot summary

Cast
 Leslie Faber as Weston  
 John F. Hamilton as Ashley  
 Maurice Evans as Langford  
 Sebastian Smith as Doctor  
 Humberston Wright as Missionary  
 Henri De Vries as Skipper  
 George Turner as Mate  
 Tom Helmore as Worthing 
 Gypsy Rhouma as Tondelayo

References

Bibliography
 Warren, Patricia. British Film Studios: An Illustrated History. Batsford, 2001.
 Wood, Linda. British Films, 1927-1939. British Film Institute, 1986.

External links
 
 

1930 films
British drama films
British silent feature films
1930 drama films
Films shot at Station Road Studios, Elstree
Films shot at Twickenham Film Studios
British black-and-white films
1930s English-language films
1920s English-language films
1930s British films
Silent drama films